Gualtar is a Portuguese parish in the municipality of Braga.

References

Freguesias of Braga